Tarnopol Voivodeship was an administrative region of interwar Poland (1918–1939), created on 23 December 1920, with an area of 16,500 km² and provincial capital in Tarnopol (now Ternopil, Ukraine). The voivodeship was divided into 17 districts (powiaty). At the end of World War II, at the insistence of Joseph Stalin during the Tehran Conference of 1943 without official Polish representation whatsoever, the borders of Poland were redrawn by the Allies. The Polish population was forcibly resettled after the defeat of Nazi Germany and the Tarnopol Voivodeship was incorporated into the Ukrainian SSR of the Soviet Union. Since 1991, most of the region is located in the Ternopil Oblast in sovereign Ukraine.

September 1939 and its aftermath
During the German-Soviet invasion of Poland in accordance with the secret protocol of Molotov–Ribbentrop Pact, the Soviet forces allied with Nazi Germany invaded eastern Poland on 17 September 1939. As the bulk of the Polish Army was concentrated in the west fighting the Germans (see also: Polish September Campaign), the Red Army met with limited resistance and their troops quickly moved westward. Tarnopol was occupied as early as 18 September 1939 without substantial opposition from the Poles, and remained in Soviet hands till Operation Barbarossa. Monuments were destroyed, street names changed, bookshops closed, library collections stolen and transported in lorries to the Russian archives. The province was Sovietized in the atmosphere of terror. Families were deported to Siberia in cattle trains, mainly Polish Christians.

A Jewish pogrom lasted from  until , with homes destroyed, synagogue burned and Jews killed indiscriminately at various locations, estimated between 1,600 (Yad Vashem) and 2,000 (Virtual Shtetl). The killings were perpetrated by the SS-Sonderkommando 4b attached to Einsatzgruppe C, and by the Ukrainian People's Militia, formed by Organization of Ukrainian Nationalists – renamed the following month as the Ukrainian Auxiliary Police.

In September 1941, the German occupation authorities established Jewish ghettos in a number of towns including the Tarnopol Ghetto with 12,000–13,000 prisoners. Death penalty was introduced, and food severely rationed. Forced labour camps for Jewish slave workers were established by the Germans in the settlements of Kamionki, Hłuboczek Wielki, Zagrobela, and in Podwołoczyska. The Tarnopol ghetto was liquidated between August 1942 and June 1943. The victims were deported to Belzec extermination camp. Many Jews were denounced by Ukrainian nationalists including shortly before the Soviets took over the area in 1944. A number survived by hiding with the Poles.

Demographics
The capital of Tarnopol Voivodeship was Tarnopol. After the rebirth of Poland, according to Polish census of 1921, the province was inhabited by 1,428,520 people with population density at 88 persons per km². The national census revealed that a staggering number of people could not read or write due to repressive policies of the partitioning powers; amounting to over half of the regional population of the Republic. Within the total number of inhabitants there were 447,810 Roman Catholics, and 847,907 Greek Catholics, as well as 128,967 Orthodox Christians. Ten years later, the next national census of September 1931 was conducted using different criteria. The respondents were asked about their mother tongue and religion. The population density grew to 97 persons per km2.

The overall number of inhabitants in the province amounted to 1,600,406 people in 1931 of whom 789,114 spoke Polish, 401,963 spoke Ukrainian as their first language, 326,172 spoke Ruthenian (Ukrainian), 71,890 spoke Yiddish, 7,042 spoke Hebrew, 2675 spoke German, and 287 spoke Belarusian, Czech and Lithuanian. Among the Poland's Ukrainian speakers, 397,248 belonged to Greek Catholic Church, and 3,767 were Roman Catholics similar to the majority of Polish language speakers at home; nevertheless, among the Polish language speakers 157,219 belonged to Greek Catholic Church also, like the majority of those who spoke Ukrainian as their mother tongue. The overlapping of religious denominations presented the community as integrated to a considerable degree. Meanwhile, the overwhelming majority of Ruthenian (Ukrainian) speakers were Greco Catholics, like Ukrainians, and only 7,625 of them were Roman Catholics. Jews constituted 44% of the diverse multicultural makeup of Tarnopol, speaking both, Yiddish and Hebrew.

Religion was 60% Greek Catholic, 31% Roman Catholic, 9% Jewish. Ethnic Ukrainian Greek Catholics and Polish-speaking secular Jews were in some cases classified as gentile Poles in the ethnic census, and not as Ukrainians or Jews; this explains the difference between the religious and ethnic census numbers.

Geography

The Voivodeship's area was 16,533 square kilometers. It was located in south-eastern corner of Poland, bordering Soviet Union to the east, Lwów Voivodeship and Stanisławów Voivodeship to the west, Romania to the south and Volhynian Voivodeship to the north. The landscape was hilly, with the Podole upland covering large part of the Voivodeship. In the north-west there is the Hologory range with the Kamula mountain (473 meters above sea level) as the highest peak (however, the Kamula was located some 5 kilometers beyond the Voivodeship's borderline, in the Lwów Voivodeship). Southern part of the Voivodeship was known for its wineries and peach orchards.

The Dniester and the Seret were the main rivers. Border with the Soviet Union was marked by the Zbruch River, along its whole course. Border of the Voivodeship (and at the same time – of Poland) with Romania was marked by the Dniester. The south-easternmost place was the famous Polish stronghold Okopy Swietej Trojcy (Ramparts of the Hole Trinity), which for some time was protecting Poland from the invasions of the Turks and the Tartars.

Administrative subdivisions
The Tarnopol Voivodeship was created formally on 23 December 1920. It consisted of 17 powiats (counties), 35 towns and 1087 villages. Its capital was also its largest city, with population of some 34,000 (as for 1931). Other important municipal centers of the voivodeship were: Czortków (pop. 19,000), Brody (pop. 16,400), Złoczów (pop. 13,000), Brzeżany (pop. 12,000) and Buczacz (pop. 11,000).

The Tarnopol Voivodeship consisted of 17 powiats (counties):

 Borszczów Powiat (1067 km²),
 Brody Powiat  (1125 km²)
 Brzeżany Powiat (1135 km²)
 Buczacz Powiat (1208 km²)
 Czortków Powiat  (734 km²)
 Kamionka Strumiłowa Powiat (1000 km²)
 Kopyczyńce Powiat (841 km²)
 Podhajce Powiat  (1018 km²)
 Przemyślany Powiat (927 km²)
 Radziechów Powiat (1022 km²)
 Skałat Powiat  (876 km²)
 Tarnopol Powiat  (1231 km²)
 Trembowla Powiat (789 km²)
 Zaleszczyki Powiat  (684 km²)
 Zbaraż Powiat (740 km²)
 Zborów Powiat (941 km²)
 Złoczów Powiat (1195 km²)

Economy
Tarnopol Voivodeship was located in the so-called Poland "B", which meant that it was underdeveloped, with scarce industry. However, agricultural production was good, due to moderate climate and rich, fertile black soil common in these areas of Europe. The southern part of the voivodship was popular among tourists, with the main center in Zaleszczyki – a border-town, located on the Dniestr, where one could spot grapevines, unique to this part of Poland. The railroad network was better developed in the south, with numerous local connections. Major rail junctions were: Tarnopol, Krasne, Kopczynce. On 1 January 1938, total length of railroads within the Voivodeship's boundaries was 931 kilometers (5.6 km per 100 km²)

Voivodes
 Karol Olpiński, 23 April 1921 – 23 January 1923
 Lucjan Zawistowski, 24 February 1923 – 16 February 1927
 Mikołaj Kwaśniewski, 16 February 1927 – 28 November 1928 (acting till 28 December 1927)
 Kazimierz Moszyński, 28 November 1928 – 10 October 1933
 Artur Maruszewski, 21 October 1933 – 15 January 1935 (acting till 6 March 1934)
 Kazimierz Gintowt-Dziewiałtowski, 19 January 1935 – 15 July 1936 (acting )
 Alfred Biłyk, 15 July 1936 – 16 April 1937
 Tomasz Malicki, 16 April 1937 – 17 September 1939

See also
 Kresy Borderlands

References

 Genealogy of Halychyna and Eastern Galicia – Results of the 1931 census according to HalGal.com
 Maly rocznik statystyczny 1939, Nakladem Glownego Urzedu Statystycznego, Warszawa 1939 (Concise Statistical Year-Book of Poland, Warsaw 1939).

 
Former voivodeships of the Second Polish Republic
History of Ternopil Oblast
1920 establishments in Poland
1939 disestablishments in Poland